Twickenham by-election may refer to one of four by-elections held for the British House of Commons constituency of Twickenham:

 1929 Twickenham by-election
 1932 Twickenham by-election
 1934 Twickenham by-election
 1955 Twickenham by-election

See also
 Twickenham constituency
 List of United Kingdom by-elections
 Twickenham